Roger Federer won one major in 2008, the US Open, defeating Briton Andy Murray, 6–2, 7–5, 6–2. Federer was defeated by Rafael Nadal in two Grand Slam finals: at the French Open, which he lost 1–6, 3–6, 0–6, and at Wimbledon in a famous five-setter, 4–6, 4–6, 7–6, 7–6, 7–9, when he was aiming for six straight wins to break Björn Borg's record. At the Australian Open, Federer lost in the semifinals to Novak Djokovic, ending his record streak of 10 consecutive Major finals. Roger Federer lost twice in Master Series 1000 Finals on clay to Nadal at Monte Carlo and Hamburg. However, Federer was able to capture three more victories in 250-level events at Estoril, Halle, and Basel.

In doubles, Federer and compatriot Stanislas Wawrinka won the gold medal at the 2008 Summer Olympics.

Year summary

Early hard court season
Federer began the year by attempting to defend his title at the Australian Open. Federer suffered an illness related to food poisoning prior to the start of the Australian Open. He lost, however, in the semifinals to eventual champion Djokovic, 5–7, 3–6, 6–7. This ended his record of ten consecutive Grand Slam finals, the most ever for a men's player.

In March, Federer revealed that he had recently been diagnosed with mononucleosis and that he may have suffered from it as early as December 2007.  He noted, however, that he was now "medically cleared to compete". Despite being cleared to compete Federer admitted that he had suffered a significant dip in fitness due to his struggle with mononucleosis, which would prove to negatively impact his results till the Miami Masters in which he lost to long-time foe, Andy Roddick.

Although Federer was seeded first and was the defending champion at the Barclays Dubai Tennis Championships, he lost to Murray in the first round. On 10 March, Federer won his third exhibition match out of four against former world no. 1 Pete Sampras at Madison Square Garden in New York City, 6–3, 6–7, 7–6.

Clay court season
Federer began the clay-court season at the Estoril Open in Portugal. This was his first tournament with coach José Higueras. and his first non-Master Series clay-court tournament since Gstaad in 2004. Federer won his first tournament of the year, when Nikolay Davydenko retired from the final while trailing, 7–6, 1–2 with a leg ligament strain.

Federer then played three Masters Series tournaments on clay. At the Masters Series Monte Carlo, Federer lost to three-time defending champion Rafael Nadal in the final in straight sets. Federer made 44 unforced errors, lost a 4–0 lead in the second set, and fell to 1–7 against Nadal on clay courts. At the Internazionali BNL d'Italia, Federer lost in the quarterfinals to Radek Štěpánek. Federer was the defending champion at the Masters Series Hamburg, but lost to Nadal in the final.

At the French Open, Federer was defeated quickly by Nadal in the final, 1–6, 3–6, 0–6. This was the fourth consecutive year that Federer and Nadal had played at the French Open, with Federer losing his third consecutive final to Nadal. Federer's record of 23–4 (2005–08) at the French Open is second only to Nadal's record of 28–0 during the same period.

Grass court season
Federer bounced back by winning the Gerry Weber Open in Halle, Germany without dropping a set or a service game. This was the fifth time he had won this event. With this result, he tied Pete Sampras's record for most titles on grass in the open era with 10.

At Wimbledon, Federer once again played world no. 2 Nadal in the final. A victory for Federer would have meant his sixth consecutive Wimbledon singles title, breaking Borg's modern era men's record and equaling the all-time record held since 1886 by William Renshaw. Federer saved two championship points in the fourth set tiebreak, but eventually lost the match, 4–6, 4–6, 7–6, 7–6, 7–9. The rain-delayed match ended in near darkness after 4 hours, 48 minutes of play, making it the longest (in terms of elapsed time) men's final in Wimbledon recorded history. It concluded 7 hours, 15 minutes after its scheduled start. The defeat also ended Federer's 65-match winning streak on grass. John McEnroe described the match as "The greatest match I've ever seen." After Nadal surpassed him as world no. 1 later in the year, Federer stated that his main goal would be to regain the Wimbledon title, rather than the top spot.

Summer hard court season
Federer made early exits in his next two singles tournaments, the Rogers Cup in Toronto, Ontario, Canada and the Western & Southern Financial Group Masters in Cincinnati, Ohio. Federer was chosen to carry the national flag at the Beijing Olympics. 

At the Summer Olympics in Beijing, Federer lost in the quarterfinals to James Blake for the first time in their nine matches. Federer however, finally won his first Olympic gold medal in the men's doubles, when he and compatriot Stanislas Wawrinka upset the world no. 1 doubles team of Bob and Mike Bryan of the United States in the semifinals and defeated Sweden's Simon Aspelin and Thomas Johansson in the final, 6–3, 6–4, 6–7, 6–3. The following day, Federer lost his world no. 1 ranking to Nadal after 237 consecutive weeks.

At the US Open, Federer reached the fourth round without dropping a set. He defeated third-seeded Novak Djokovic in a rematch of the 2007 US Open Final, 6–3, 5–7, 7–5, 6–2, in the semifinals, and then defeated Andy Murray, who was playing in his first Grand Slam final, 6–2, 7–5, 6–2, to win his fifth straight US Open title and 13th career Grand Slam title, leaving him one Grand Slam title from tying Pete Sampras's all-time record of 14. This extended his US Open winning streak to 34 matches. Federer became the first player in tennis history to have five consecutive wins at both Wimbledon and the US Open.

Fall indoor season
At the Mutua Madrileña Masters Madrid, Federer reached the semifinals without losing a set. There he lost to Murray, 6–3, 3–6, 5–7. Meanwhile, he became the all-time leader in career prize money in men's tennis, earning over US$43.3 million at the end of the tournament and surpassing 14-time Grand Slam singles champion Pete Sampras.

Federer won his 57th career title at the Davidoff Swiss Indoors in Basel, beating David Nalbandian in the final. He became the only player in history to win the title three consecutive years.

He reached the quarterfinals of his next event, the BNP Paribas Masters in Paris, before withdrawing because of back pain. This was the first time in Federer's career of 763 matches that he had withdrawn from a tournament. This meant that 2008 was the first year since 2003 in which he did not win a Masters Series title. Federer entered the Tennis Masters Cup as the top-seeded player, after Nadal withdrew from the tournament. He drew Simon, Murray, and Roddick in the Red Group. In his opening match, Federer lost to Simon, but kept his hopes alive by defeating Roddick's replacement, Stepanek, in his second match. He lost his third match to Murray, 6–4, 6–7, 5–7. Federer had received medical treatment for back and hip problems in the third set, but lost after saving seven match points. However, Federer still ended the year ranked world no. 2.

Matches

Grand Slam performance

All matches

Singles

Doubles

Source (ATP)

Yearly records

Finals

Singles: 8 (4–4)

See also
Roger Federer
Roger Federer career statistics
2008 Rafael Nadal tennis season
2008 Novak Djokovic tennis season

References

External links
  
 ATP tour profile

2008
Federer season
Medalists at the 2008 Summer Olympics
Tennis players at the 2008 Summer Olympics
2008 in Swiss tennis
2008 in Swiss sport